Tenuwapati  is in Bariyarpatti Gaupalikas or Rural municipalities of Siraha District in the Sagarmatha Zone of south-eastern Nepal. At the time of the 1991 Nepal census it had a population of 3365 people living in 601 individual households.

Organisation Working:

 Yuwa Dalan: A youth organisation involved in empowering youth and society of tenuwapatti.

References

External links
UN map of the municipalities of  Siraha District

Populated places in Siraha District